Herold Truffer (born July 14, 1936) is a retired Swiss professional ice hockey player who represented the Swiss national team at the 1964 Winter Olympics.

References

External links

Living people
1936 births
Ice hockey players at the 1964 Winter Olympics
Olympic ice hockey players of Switzerland